The government of the Republic of Abkhazia, which considers itself independent from Georgia, issues its own vehicle registration plates for the motor vehicles registered in the territory it controls. The design of the plates is based on that of Russian license plates, although Abkhazian plates lack the regional coding of Russian plates.

The license plate serial format consists of a letter followed by three digits and then two more letters. The letters are Cyrillic, but only thirteen letters reminiscent of letters of the Latin alphabet are used: А, Б, В, Е, К, М, Н, О, Р, С, Т, У, and Х.

In the territory controlled by the government of Georgia (before 2008), the Georgian license plates were issued. Since 2004, cars with Georgian plates are prohibited in Abkhazia, as are Abkhazian plates in mainland Georgia. Cross-border travel is therefore only possible with Russian, Armenian, or Azeri plates.

References

Transport in Abkhazia
Road transport in Georgia (country)
Abkhazia
Abkhazia-related lists

de:Kfz-Kennzeichen (Georgien)#Abchasien und Südossetien